Finder is a comparison website. It operates sites in 83 countries and has over 400 employees, with 9.7 million visitors a month worldwide.  It is the most-visited comparison site in Australia.

History

The creditcardfinder.com.au site was launched in 2006 by Fred Schebesta and Frank Restuccia, using $1.36 million raised from their sale of previous company Freestyle Media.   Schebesta, Restuccia and co-founder Jeremy Cabral, who joined Finder in 2008, are all featured on the 2020 Australian Financial Review Young Rich list.
The main Finder site launched in 2012. A US version of the site launched in July 2015. 

The Finder app was launched in 2020 for iOS and Android. The company spent $5 million developing it and signed up 118,000 users by November 2020.

Comparison products

Finder compares products in over 100 categories.  Its comparisons include credit cards, home loans, bank accounts, insurance, mobile phones and plans, broadband, shopping coupons, Internet TV and energy. Unlike many other comparison sites, it is not owned by or affiliated with an insurance provider.

References

External links 

 Australian site

 US site

 UK site

Comparison shopping websites